The Flores Sea cuckoo-dove (Macropygia macassariensis) is a species of bird in the family Columbidae. It is found on Sulawesi, Tanakeke and Selayar Islands, and some of the eastern Lesser Sundas. It was previously lumped together with the Tanimbar cuckoo-dove and the Timor cuckoo-dove as the dusky or bar-necked cuckoo-dove. The Flores Sea cuckoo-dove has two subspecies:
 M. m. macassariensis Wallace, 1865 - southwest Sulawesi, Selayar and Tanakeke Islands. 
 M. m. longa Meise, 1930 - Tanahjampea and Kalaotoa Is. (eastern Lesser Sundas)

References

 Ng, E.Y.X., J.A. Eaton, P. Verbelen, R.O. Hutchinson, and F.E. Rheindt. 2016. Using bioacoustic data to test species limits in an Indo-Pacific island radiation of Macropygia cuckoo doves. Biological Journal of the Linnean Society 118: 786–812.

Macropygia
Birds of Indonesia
Birds described in 1865